Mark Anthony Pivarunas  (born 31 October 1958) is an American sedevacantist Traditionalist Catholic bishop and the Superior General of the Congregation of Mary Immaculate Queen (CMRI).

Biography

Early life and family

Mark Anthony Pivarunas was born to his father, Walter Pivarunas, and to an ethnic Italian mother, on 31 October 1958, in Chicago, Illinois, United States. He was baptized on 7 December of the same year, in Seven Holy Founders Church in the same city. He received his first Communion on 7 May 1966, and was confirmed on 6 June 1967.

Religious life

Pivarunas entered the religious life in the sedevacantist Congregation of Mary Immaculate Queen (CMRI) in September 1974. After a year's postulancy, he entered the novitiate on 8 September 1975, taking the religious name of Brother Mary Tarcisius. He made his first profession of vows on 12 September 1976. On 12 September 1980, he made his final profession of vows.

Priesthood

Pivarunas received the usual seminary training. On 27 June 1985, in the CMRI's Mount Saint Michael, having received the commendation of his superiors, he, along with two others, was ordained a priest by Bishop George Musey.

Superior Generalship

In August 1989, Pivarunas, now thirty years old, was elected to the post of Superior General of the CMRI.

Pivarunas traveled extensively throughout Nebraska, United States, and into neighboring states to provide the Mass and sacraments.

Episcopacy

In January 1991, Bishop Moisés Carmona of Acapulco, Guerrero, Mexico, another sedevacantist bishop whose episcopal lineage traces to Thục, visited Mount Saint Michael. Before his return to Mexico, on 1 February 1991, he left behind a letter expressing his desire to consecrate as bishop whomever the congregation chooses. On 3 April 1991, Pivarunas was elected to be consecrated a bishop.

In accordance with Catholic practice, he discontinued the use of his religious name, "Tarcisius".

On 24 September 1991, in Mount Saint Michael, Pivarunas was consecrated a bishop by Carmona.

On 30 November 1993, in Cincinnati, Ohio, United States, Pivarunas consecrated the sedevacantist Father Daniel Dolan a bishop.

On 11 May 1999, in Acapulco, Guerrero, Mexico, with Dolan assisting as co-consecrator, Pivarunas consecrated Father Martín Dávila of the sedevacantist Sociedad Sacerdotal Trento (Priestly Society of Trent) a bishop.

Since his episcopal consecration, Pivarunas has traveled to the United States, Mexico, Canada, New Zealand, South America, and Europe to provide Confirmation and other sacraments to several thousand children and adults. According to the CMRI, there are over a hundred priests and Religious under his spiritual care.

References

External links

Congregation of Mary Immaculate Queen

1958 births
Living people
People from Chicago
American people of Lithuanian descent
American people of Italian descent
Thục line bishops
Sedevacantists
American traditionalist Catholics